Radegast is a river of Mecklenburg-Vorpommern, Germany. It is a left tributary of the Stepenitz.

See also
List of rivers of Mecklenburg-Vorpommern

Rivers of Mecklenburg-Western Pomerania
Natura 2000 in Germany
Rivers of Germany